Beside You may refer to:

Beside You—30 Years of Hits, Dave Dobbyn album
"Beside You" (Van Morrison song)
"Beside You" (Marianas Trench song)
"Beside You" (Dave Dobbyn song)
"Beside You", song by 5 Seconds of Summer
"Beside You", song by Iggy Pop from American Caesar
"Beside You", song by Ben Mills from Picture of You
"Beside You", song by The Crests,	Bert Keyes, Billy Dawn Smith 1958
"Beside You", song by  The Swallows,	Denby, Conrad / The Flamingos	Benby, Conrad, Levinson 1960
"Beside You", song by Jerry Butler,	Gamble, Huff, Butler 1968
"Beside You", song by Nolan Strong, Nolan Strong 1962
"Beside You", song by The Illusion,	Jeff Barry, R. Carniglia, C. Alder, M. Maniscalco, M. Ricciardella, J. Vinci 1970
"Beside You", song by The New York Rock Ensemble, M. Fulterman, Michael Kamen 1970

See also
Beside Yourself, compilation album by The Church